The Seven Raymonds were a comic revue troupe founded in 1987 by Oxford University undergraduates. 
 
The Seven Raymonds were Stewart Lee, Richard Herring, Emma Kennedy, Michael Cosgrave, Richard Canning, and Jo Renshaw. They supported The Oxford Revue at the Edinburgh Festival in 1987.

They appeared at the Edinburgh Fringe in 1987 in the show .

The troupe fell out over the continuing involvement of Jo Renshaw. After Renshaw was told she could not take part further, arguments ensued and Richard Canning subsequently left the group. He was replaced by comic writer Tim Richardson.

Lee and Herring became a successful double act on radio and television. Cosgrave became a jazz musician with Celtic band Sin É and the bluegrass/jam band Daily Planet. Kennedy became a television presenter, actress and writer. Canning is an academic. Richardson works as a journalist and writer.

References

External links
Emma Kennedy official website
Richard Herring official website
Stewart Lee official website
FistofFun.net - Downloads page includes a 7 Raymonds bootleg in the "Live Bootlegs" section.

British comedy troupes
Septets
Student comedy troupes
1987 establishments in England
Alumni of the University of Oxford